is a Japanese cellist and composer.

Mizoguchi started playing piano at the age of 3, and the cello at the age of 11. From 1978–1985 he attended the  Tokyo National University of Fine Arts and Music where he majored in violoncello.

In 1986, he released his first album, Half Inch Dessert, being listed as composer, arranger, and performer. From that time on, he has released more than 20 albums including motion picture soundtracks.

He is noted for his compositions for animation, namely the soundtrack to the animated feature film Jin-Roh: The Wolf Brigade and a collaboration with Yoko Kanno on the animated series The Vision of Escaflowne and it's subsequent film Escaflowne. He also collaborated with Keishi Urata on the animated series Texhnolyze. In 2006, he composed the music to Tokimeki Memorial Only Love (along with Teruyuki Nobuchika) and the Fuji TV noitamina series Jyu Oh Sei. He composed and plays the opening and ending theme for TV Asahi's series See the World by Train, which has run since June 1987. His song "Bruce", from 1986's Oasis Behind the Clear Water, appears in various scenes of the 1987 animation To-y.

Anime

References

External links
 
 
 Hajime Mizoguchi anime at Media Arts Database 
 

1960 births
Anime composers
Japanese cellists
Japanese film score composers
Japanese male film score composers
Japanese music arrangers
Living people
Tokyo University of the Arts alumni